French Junior Open squash championship  is considered one of the most prestigious junior open squash championship in Europe and in the world. The tournament hosts nearly 300 players representing between 20 and 25 countries every year. The tournament is organize by the European Squash Federation and the French Squash Federation.

French Junior Open is divided into eight categories — Boys Under-19, Boys Under-17, Boys Under-15, Boys Under-13, Girls Under-19, Girls Under-17, Girls Under-15 and Girls Under-13.

List of winners by category (Boys)

Boys' champions by country

List of winners by category (Girls)

Girls' champions by country

See also
 World Junior Squash Circuit
 World Junior Squash Championships
 British Junior Open Squash
 Dutch Junior Open Squash
 US Junior Open squash championship
 European Squash Federation
 French Squash Federation

References

External links
French Junior Open history
French Junior Open SquashSite website

Squash tournaments in France
Squash records and statistics
Youth sport in France